Arthur Daffen (30 December 1861 – 9 July 1938) was an English cricketer. He played sixteen first-class matches for Kent between 1890 and 1891.

References

External links
 

1861 births
1938 deaths
Berkshire cricketers
Cricketers from Nottinghamshire
English cricketers
Kent cricketers
Sportspeople from Retford